Mehmandust (also Romanized as Mehmāndūst) is a village in Barvanan-e Gharbi Rural District, Torkamanchay District, Meyaneh County, East Azerbaijan Province, Iran. At the 2006 census, its population was 265, in 52 families.

References 

Populated places in Meyaneh County